Baba Bhaskar Nath (born 23 September 1994) is an Indian classical instrumentalist. He plays the Shehnai belonging to Meerut Shehnai Gharana. He is a child prodigy.

Early life
Baba Bhaskar Nath was born in New Delhi in a family of musicians originally hailing from Meerut to classical singer Pandit Vishwanath and K Rajlaxmi. His uncle is Pandit Jagannath, also a Shehnai player. He started learning Shehanai and Harmonium at a young age under the guidance of his grandfather Om Prakash. He is schooling at Delhi Public School. He is training under vocalist Pandit Jasraj.

Career

Baba Bhaskar Nath gave his first solo performance at the age of 10. His renders in ragas in Gayaki ang (style), Banarasi dhun, Thumri, Chaiti, Kajri and Tappa.

Baba Bhaskar Nath belongs to a family of renowned musicians of Meerut Shehnai Gharana. He started his early training in Shehnai, Flute, and Harmonium at a very young age under the guidance of his grand father, the Late. Pt. Om Prakash, his paternal uncle, Sangeet Natak Academy Awarded the Late. Pt. Jagannath who was an internationally acclaimed Shehnai Vadak and his father the renowned vocalist of Kirana Gharana, Yash Bharati Awardee Pt. Vishwanath. He is currently learning the fine nuances of music under Guru Shishya Parampra from “Padam Vibhushan” Sangeet Martand, Pt. Jasraj ji.

He performed at major festivals, such as the Sawai Gandharva Bhimsen Festival in 2010, and Pandit Motiram Pandit Maniram Sangeet Samaroh in 2011. He has done his graduation in Economic (HONS) from Hindu college, University of Delhi .

Baba Bhaskar Nath has imbibed his paternal uncle, Pt. Jagannath Ji’s highly colourful imaginative style of rendering Ragas in the gayaki ang style and Banarsi Dhune/ Thumri/ Chaiti/ Kajri &
spl. In Tappa.

Awards
 1st Prize in All India Music Competition
 1st Prize in All India Delhi Public School Competition

Performances
 Meerut Mahotsav, Meerut – 2005-2006
 A.I.R, Udaipur - 2006
 Sankat Mochan Sangeet Samaroh, Varanasi – 2009
 Baba Vishwanath Sangeet Samaroh, Delhi – 2009
 “Bharat Ratna” M.S. Subbalakshmi Sangeet Samaro (Shankra Art’s), Varanasi
 Ustaad Allauddin Khan Sangeet Evam Kala Academy, Bhopal, M.P.
 Saptak Sangeet Samaroh – Ahmedabad
 Pt. Omkar nath Sangeet Samaroh – Mumbai
 Kal-Ke-Kalakaar – Mumbai
 Mridangacharya Nana Saheb Pharse Smriti Samaroh, Damoh, M.P. Organised by (Ustad Allauddin Khan Sangeet Evam Kala Academy)
 Ustad Bismillah Khan Smriti Samaroh, Jaipur organised by (Shruti Mandal & Rajasthan Cultural Ministry)
 Swar Amrit Sangeet Samaroh – Mahakumbh Mela, Haridwaar
 Pt. Vishnu Prasanna Smriti Samaroh, Kashi Baithak, Delhi – 2010
 Epi Center, Gurgaon – 2010
 Rama Krishna Mission, Lucknow (148th Anniversary of Swami Vivekananda)
 Shri Durgyana Sangeet Samaroh, Amritsar.
 Ustad Bade Ghulam Ali Khan Smriti Samaroh, Chandigarh.
 Ravindra Bhawan, M.P. Sanskriti Parishad.
 Sawai Gandharv, Pune
 39th Pt. Mani Pt. Moti Ram Sangeet Samaroh, Hyderabad (organised by Pt. Jasraj ji).
 Virasat, Dehradoon
 Idea Jalsa, Zee tv.
 Youth Mahotsav’2011, Delhi by Delhi Government
 Indo French Music Concert, Paris, France
 Swami Harivallabh sangeet samaroh Vrindavan
 North American Bengali Conference, Houston, USA 2015
 Akashwani Sangeet Sammelan, Gulbarga, 2016
 Saptak Sangeet Samaroh, Ahmedabad, 2016
 Mata Niramala Devi Foundation
 SVBC, Tirumala, Tirupathi
 Shruti Mandal Jaipur
 Shani Mandir, Indore,

Notes

References
 Bhaskar Nath Interview by THE HINDU NEWSPAPER
 Bhaskar Nath, Hindustan Times
 Bhaskar Nath, Performing in the memory of Bharat Ratan Ustad Bismillah Khan Sahab 
 Bhaskar Nath, Indian Express 
 Bhaskar Nath, Deccan Herald
 Bhaskar Nath, Times of India 

Hindustani instrumentalists
Shehnai players
1984 births
Living people